Floyd County is the name of six counties in the United States:

 Floyd County, Georgia 
 Floyd County, Indiana 
 Floyd County, Iowa 
 Floyd County, Kentucky 
 Floyd County, Texas 
 Floyd County, Virginia